North East Scotland or North Eastern Scotland may refer to the following areas of Scotland in the United Kingdom:

North East Scotland (Scottish Parliament electoral region)
North East Scotland (European Parliament constituency), a former constituency
North Eastern Scotland, a ITL 2 statistical region, see International Territorial Level

See also
Lists of regions of Scotland
North East Scotland College
North East Scotland Football Association